Mindstorm is a 2001 Sci Fi Pictures science fiction television film directed by Richard Pepin, and starring Eric Roberts and Michael Ironside. It's not to be confused with Project: Human Weapon (aka Mindstorm) starring Judge Reinhold, released in the same year.

Plot
When psychic private detective Tracy Wellman is retained by presidential candidate Senator William Armitage help to find his missing daughter, Rayanna, she encounters the telepathic cult leader David Mendez, who helps her learn they were both products of Cold War experiments. Mendez wants revenge against Armitage, who at the time was the NSA Director, and who betrayed the program to the Soviets. With the help of her friend, FBI Agent Dan Oliver, Wellman later discovers Mendez's motives go far beyond revenge, forcing her to confront her past and her missing memories.

Cast
Source:

 Emmanuelle Vaugier as Tracey Wellman 
 Eric Roberts as David Mendez
 Michael Ironside as Senator William Armitage
 Antonio Sabàto Jr. as FBI Agent Dan Oliver 
 William B. Davis as Dr. Parish 
 Clarence Williams III as Walter Golden
 Mark Holden as FBI Agent Mark Taft

Production and release
The film was shot in Vancouver, British Columbia. It was released as a  Sci Fi Pictures science fiction TV-movie.

Home media
Mindstorm was released on DVD in the U.S. by Monarch Home Video.

References

External links
 
 

2001 science fiction films
2001 television films
2001 films
Films shot in Bulgaria
Syfy original films
Films directed by Richard Pepin
2000s American films